Colombia's Next Top Model, Cycle 2 is the second cycle of Colombia's Next Top Model.

Castings for cycle 2 began on August 6, 2013 and culminated on August 31 of the same year. Carolina Cruz joined Franklin Ramos as the new host, replacing Carolina Guerra, who had to leave the show due to various work commitments. Kika Rocha and Catalina Aristizabal returned for panel this season, while Raul Higuera confirmed his departure from the show. He was replaced by Mauricio Velez.

The prizes for this season included a cash prize of COL$50,000,000, the front cover of Cromos Magazine and a contract with Chica Águila. The winner of the competition was 21-year-old Yuriko Londoño from Bucaramanga.

Contestants
(ages stated are at start of contest)

Episodes

Episode 1
First aired January 13, 2014

Eliminated: Annie Barros, Laura Agudelo, Mayra Cervantes & Zahira Díaz
Featured photographer: Germán Velásquez
Featured director: Felipe Dote

Episode 2
First aired January 14, 2014

Immune: Johana Ríos
Eliminated: Vanessa Parra
Featured photographer: Carlos Gaviria

Episode 3
First aired January 15, 2014

Challenge winners: Dayana Delgado, Estefanía Infante, Lilibeth Romero, Titi Ramírez & Vanessa Ferraro
Immune: Tuti Vega
First call-out: Vanessa Ferraro	
Bottom two: Camila Quintero & Jessica Mata	
Eliminated: Jessica Mata	
Featured photographer: Nicolas Quevedo

Episode 4
First aired January 16, 2014

Challenge winner: Tuti Vega
Immunity winner: Estefanía Infante
Featured photographer: Fabián Garzón

Episode 5
First aired January 16, 2014

Challenge winner: Camila Quintero
Immune: Estefanía Infante
First call-out: Lina Cardona
Bottom two: Carolina Calvo & Titi Ramírez	
Eliminated: Carolina Calvo	
Featured photographer: Zizza Limberti

Episode 6
First aired January 20, 2014

Challenge winner: Estefanía Infante
Immunity winner: Lina Cardona
Featured photographer: Oscar Nizo

Episode 7
First aired January 21, 2014

Challenge winner: Camila Quintero
Immune: Lina Cardona	
First call-out: Yuriko Londoño	
Bottom two:  Titi Ramírez & Tuti Vega	
Eliminated: Titi Ramírez	
Featured photographer: Zuan Carreño

Episode 8
First aired January 22, 2014

Immunity Winner: Juliana Moreno

Episode 9
First aired January 23, 2014

Immune: Juliana Moreno
First call-out: Camila Quintero	
Bottom two: Johana Ríos & Tuti Vega	
Eliminated: Tuti Vega

Episode 10
First aired January 24, 2014

Immunity Winner: Yuriko Londoño

Episode 11
First aired January 27, 2014

Immune: Yuriko Londoño
First call-out: Vanessa Ferraro
Bottom two: Cristina López & Camila Quintero
Eliminated: Camila Quintero

Episode 12
First aired January 28, 2014

Immunity Winner: Lina Cardona

Episode 13
First aired January 29, 2014

Immune: Lina Cardona
First call-out: Vanessa Ferraro & Yuriko Londoño	
Bottom two: Johana Ríos & Lilibeth Romero
Eliminated: Johana Ríos

Episode 14
First aired January 30, 2014

Immunity Winner: Lilibeth Romero	(Revealed the following episode)

Episode 15
First aired January 31, 2014

Immune: Lilibeth Romero	
First call-out: Juliana Moreno	
Bottom two: Cristina López & Katherine Moscoso	
Eliminated: Katherine Moscoso

Episode 16
First aired February 3, 2014

First call-out: Juliana Moreno & Dayana Delgado	
Eliminated: None

Episode 17
First aired February 4, 2014

First call-out: Juliana Moreno
Eliminated: None

Episode 18
First aired February 5, 2014

First call-out: Yuriko Londoño	
Eliminated: None

Episode 19
First aired February 6, 2014

Eliminated: None

Live finale
First aired February 7, 2014

First call-out: Yuriko Londoño
Bottom five: Cristina López, Dayana Delgado, Estefanía Infante, Juliana Moreno & Vanessa Ferraro	 
Eliminated: Cristina López, Dayana Delgado, Estefanía Infante & Vanessa Ferraro	
Final Four: Juliana Moreno, Lilibeth Romero, Lina Cardona & Yuriko Londoño	
Colombia's Next Top Model: Yuriko Londoño

Summaries

Call-out order

  The contestant was put through collectively to the next round 
 The contestant was immune from elimination
 The contestant was eliminated
 The contestant won the competition
Episode 1 was the casting episode.
In episode 2, Johana was immune from elimination for having performed the best during the photo shoot. The result for that week was based on a contestants' vote. Vanessa P. was eliminated as a result of having received the highest number of votes at 7. Lilibeth received 5 votes, Camila 2, and Katherine and Titi received 1 vote each.
In episode 3, Tuti was immune from elimination for having performed the best during the photo shoot.
After episode 3, eliminations took place every second episode. The best-performing girl for each photo shoot was declared the episode before each elimination (except in the last round before the finale, where the best-performing girl (Lilibeth) in the same episode as the elimination), with that girl winning immunity from elimination.
 In episodes 16–19, the show took a break from eliminations to prolong the voting session that would decide the top four during the live finale.
 Episode 20 was the live finale. The public vote decided the top four, and from the four remaining contestants, the judges determined the winner.

Photo shoot guide
 Episode 1 photo shoot: Mannequins in groups
 Episode 2 photo shoot: Insects and reptiles beauty shots
 Episode 3 photo shoot: Topless mermaids on a military cruiser
 Episode 4 photo shoot: Attacked by a horde of zombies
 Episode 5 photo shoot: Carnival dancers in front of Christ the Redeemer
 Episode 6 photo shoot: Soccer players from around the world
 Episode 7 photo shoot: Landfill couture
 Episode 8 photo shoot: Nude and covered in chocolate
 Episode 9 photo shoot: Beauty and the beast in a cemetery
 Episode 10 photo shoot: Feral animals in the jungle
 Episode 11 photo shoot: Fierce eyes above water
 Episode 12 photo shoot: Palmolive Shampoo ads in a shower
 Episode 13 photo shoot: Boxing in pairs in B&W
 Episode 14 photo shoots: Brides on a sailboat; scuba diving with fabric
 Episode 15 photo shoot: Swimwear on the beach for Chica Aguila
 Episode 16 photo shoots: Colors with a garden hose; happy & sad beauty shots
 Episode 17 photo shoots: Skiing cowgirls for Lady Speed stick; detriments of smoking
 Episode 18 photo shoots: Bats hanging upside down; lifted by a weight lifter in B&W
 Episode 19 photo shoots: Amazonian warriors; portraying Eve in body paint

External links
 Official website
  Colombia's Next Top Model Facebook page

References

2014 Colombian television seasons
Colombia's Next Top Model